Soul Alone is the third studio album by American singer and musician Daryl Hall, released in 1993 on Epic Records. Distinct from the sound of his successful duo Hall & Oates, this album features a more soulful and jazzy feel, with production by Hall with Peter Lord Moreland and V. Jeffrey Smith from R&B group The Family Stand, and Michael Peden. However, Epic failed to find a marketing niche for Hall's new sound, and the album was not a commercial success. Soul Alone features singer Mariah Carey, Alan Gorrie from the Average White Band, and producer/multi-instrumentalist Walter Afanasieff as composers. Four singles were released from the album: "I'm in a Philly Mood," "Stop Loving Me, Stop Loving You," "Help Me Find a Way to Your Heart" and "Wildfire." The Japanese version of the album came with an extra 12th track, "I've Finally Seen the Light."

Songwriter Janna Allen, who co-composed "Written in Stone" (the only song on the album Hall didn't have a hand in writing), died two weeks before the album's release. In addition to being a longtime musical collaborator of Hall's, she was the sister of his longtime girlfriend Sara Allen.

Singles
"I'm in a Philly Mood" was the first single released from the album, reaching number 82 on the US Billboard Hot 100 on October 2, 1993 and remaining on the chart for two weeks. It was also released as a single in the United Kingdom, reaching number 59 in the UK Singles Chart. "Stop Loving Me, Stop Loving You" was released as the second single from the album, reaching number 30 in the UK in 1994. This was followed by a re-release of "I'm in a Philly Mood", this time it reached number 52. The third single from the album, "Help Me Find a Way to Your Heart", co-written by Mariah Carey and Walter Afanasieff, reached number 70 in the UK. The fourth and final single to be released from the album, "Wildfire", reached number 99 in the UK Singles Chart.

Track listing

Japanese bonus track

Personnel

Musicians 

 Daryl Hall – lead and backing vocals, keyboards
 Peter Lord Moreland – keyboards (1–4, 7, 9), backing vocals (1, 3, 4, 7, 8, 9, 11)
 Alec Shantzis – keyboards (1)
 V. Jeffrey Smith – programming (1–4, 7, 9), electric guitar (1), synth bass (1, 2, 3, 8), backing vocals (1, 3, 4, 7, 8, 9, 11), keyboards (2), guitars (8), saxophone (9)
 Mel Wesson – additional programming (1, 9), programming (5, 10, 11)
 Peter Moshay – additional programming (2), programming (7, 8)
 Peter "Ski" Schwartz – keyboards (2)
 Eric Kupper – keyboards (3)
 Tommy Eyre – keyboards (5, 6, 10, 11)
 Terry Burrus – acoustic piano (9)
 Larry Tagg (credited as "Tag") – guitars (10)
 Alan Gorrie – bass (1), backing vocals (1, 6, 9, 10, 11)
 Tom "T-Bone" Wolk – bass (4, 9), acoustic guitar (4, 9)
 Bob Bitsand – bass (5, 10, 11)
 Rich Tancredi – bass (7)
 Bernard Davis – drums (4, 9)
 Trevor Murrell – drums (10, 11)
 Miles Bould – percussion (5, 10, 11) 
 Frank Ricotti – vibraphone (6)
 Phil Todd – flute (5), saxophone (5), EWI (11)
 Charles DeChant – saxophone (6, 10)
 Arif Mardin – string arrangements and scoring (1, 2)
 Joe Mardin – string arrangements and scoring (1, 2)
 Nick Ingman – string arrangements (5, 6, 11), conductor (11)
 William Jones – scoring (11) 
 Gavyn Wright – orchestra leader (1, 2, 5, 6, 9, 11)
 The London Session Orchestra – strings (1, 2, 5, 6, 9, 11)
 Sandra St. Victor – backing vocals (1, 3, 4, 7, 8, 9, 11)
 Lorna Bannon – backing vocals (5, 10)
 Tee Green – backing vocals (5, 10)
 Lorraine McIntosh – backing vocals (5)

Production 
 Producers – Daryl Hall, Peter Lord Moreland and V. Jeffrey Smith (tracks 1–4, 7, 8 & 9); Michael Peden (tracks 5, 6, 10 & 11).
 Engineers – Peter Moshay (tracks 1–4, 7, 8 & 9); Martin Hayles (tracks 5, 6, 10 & 11).
 Assistant engineers – Paul "Max" Bloom (tracks 5 & 11); Yan Meemi (tracks 5, 6 & 10).
 Strings on tracks 1, 2, 5, 6, 9 & 11 recorded by Martin Hayles.
 Mixing – David Morales and John Poppo (tracks 1–4, 7, 8, 9 & 11); Michael Peden  (tracks 5, 6 & 10).
 Recorded at A-Pawling Studios (Pawling, NY); Battery Studios, Little Yard Studio and The Hit Factory (London, England).
 Mastered by Vlado Meller at Sony Music Studios (New York, NY).
 Art direction – Tony Sellari
 Assistant design – Aimée Macauley
 Photography – Dave Stewart
 Management – Horizon Entertainment Management Group, Inc.

Charts

Notes 

Daryl Hall albums
1993 albums
Epic Records albums
Albums produced by Mike Peden